The United States House of Representatives elections in California, 1902 was an election for California's delegation to the United States House of Representatives, which occurred as part of the general election of the House of Representatives on November 4, 1902. California gained one seat as a result of the 1900 Census, which Republicans won. However, of the existing districts, Democrats won three Republican-held districts.

Overview

Delegation Composition

Results

District 1

District 2

District 3

District 4

District 5

District 6

District 7

District 8

See also
58th United States Congress
Political party strength in California
Political party strength in U.S. states
United States House of Representatives elections, 1902

References
California Elections Page
Office of the Clerk of the House of Representatives

External links
California Legislative District Maps (1911-Present)
RAND California Election Returns: District Definitions

United States House of Representatives
1902
California